Campello station is an MBTA Commuter Rail station in Brockton, Massachusetts on the Middleborough/Lakeville Line. Campello station was built on a line that was once part of the original Fall River Railroad. The station opened on September 26, 1997, along with the rest of the Old Colony Lines.

A former station at the site, serving shoe factories and other industry, was a stop until the end of Old Colony Division passenger service on June 30, 1959. By that time, passengers used a small wooden shelter rather than the abandoned stone station.

References

External links

MBTA - Campello

MBTA Commuter Rail stations in Plymouth County, Massachusetts
Stations along Old Colony Railroad lines
Railway stations in the United States opened in 1997